Pierre Hernandez (22 November 1928 – 27 January 2015) was a French boxer. He competed in the men's welterweight event at the 1948 Summer Olympics.

References

1928 births
2015 deaths
French male boxers
Olympic boxers of France
Boxers at the 1948 Summer Olympics
Sportspeople from Bayonne
Welterweight boxers